The 2012 San Diego County Credit Union Poinsettia Bowl is a post-season American college football bowl game held on December 20, 2012 at Qualcomm Stadium in San Diego, California in the United States. The eighth edition of the Poinsettia Bowl began at 5:00 p.m. PST and aired on ESPN. It featured the Mountain West Conference co-champion San Diego State Aztecs (whose regular home stadium is Qualcomm) against the BYU Cougars (which had been in the MW until 2011 before playing as an FBS independent), and was the final game of the 2012 NCAA Division I FBS football season for both teams. The Cougars accepted their invitation after earning a 6–4 record in their first ten games of the season (and would finish 7-5), while the Aztecs accepted their invitation after finishing with a 9-3 record in their season

Teams
In 2009, the Poinsettia Bowl announced that it had extended its agreement to continue to feature the Mountain West's second bowl-eligible team until at least 2013.  In addition, BYU has a three-year deal to play in the Poinsettia Bowl should they not qualify for a Bowl Championship Series game.

This was the thirty-sixth meeting between these two teams. BYU leads the all-time record 28-7-1. The last time they played was in 2010.

BYU

The Cougars' season followed a specific pattern for the first ten games, winning their first two games, losing their next two, winning their next two, losing their next two, and again winning their next two.  After defeating the Idaho Vandals to bring their season record to 6–4, the Cougars accepted the second invitation of the 2012–13 NCAA Bowl season to the 2012 Poinsettia Bowl. BYU finished the regular season with a 7–5 record.

San Diego State

The Aztecs are on a seven-game winning streak, with their last loss coming from a game against Fresno State on September 29. After defeating the Wyoming Cowboys, the Aztecs accepted an invitation to the 2012 Poinsettia Bowl. San Diego State finished the regular season with a 9–3 record.

This will be the Aztecs' second Poinsettia Bowl, following the 2010 game where they defeated the Navy Midshipmen by a score of 35-14.

Game summary

Scoring summary

Statistics

Passing

Rushing

Receiving

References

Poinsettia Bowl
Poinsettia Bowl
BYU Cougars football bowl games
San Diego State Aztecs football bowl games
Poinsettia Bowl
December 2012 sports events in the United States
2010s in San Diego